Mike Clancy is a British trade union leader.

Clancy grew up in Liverpool and studied law before pursuing a career in industrial relations.  He undertook further study at the University of Warwick, then became a researcher at the Clearing Bank Union.  He then became a negotiator for the union, before in 1989 becoming an area secretary for the Engineers' and Managers' Association.  He later became a national officer for the union, with time out in 2000 to complete an MBA at Cranfield University.

In 2001, the EMA merged into the new Prospect, with Clancy remaining a national officer until 2004, when he was appointed as deputy general secretary.  He was elected as general secretary in 2012, also winning a seat on the General Council of the Trades Union Congress.  In 2016, he was also appointed to the council of ACAS, and from 2017 he sat on the Nuclear Industry Council.

References

Year of birth missing (living people)
Living people
Alumni of Cranfield University
Alumni of the University of Warwick
General secretaries of British trade unions
Members of the General Council of the Trades Union Congress
People from Liverpool